Francesco Giacomelli (born 16 April 1957) is an Italian ski jumper. He competed in the normal hill and large hill events at the 1976 Winter Olympics.

References

External links
 

1957 births
Living people
Italian male ski jumpers
Italian male Nordic combined skiers
Olympic ski jumpers of Italy
Olympic Nordic combined skiers of Italy
Ski jumpers at the 1976 Winter Olympics
Nordic combined skiers at the 1976 Winter Olympics
Sportspeople from Trentino